Alan Grant (born March 1991) is an Irish hurler who plays as a right wing-forward at senior level for the Derry county team.

Grant made his debut on the inter-county scene when he was selected for the Derry minor team. After two unsuccessful seasons in this grade, he joined the under-21 team. Grant made his debut with the Derry senior team during the 2010 league. Since then he has become a regular member of the team and has won a Nicky Rackard Cup medal. He also won a Christy Ring Champion 15 award.

Honours

Derry
Nicky Rackard Cup (1): 2017

References

1991 births
Living people
Na Magha hurlers
Seán Donlons Gaelic footballers
Dual players
Derry inter-county hurlers
Ulster inter-provincial hurlers